St. Marys is a city in Elk County, Pennsylvania, United States. The population is 12,429 as of 2019. Originally a small town inhabited by mostly Bavarian Roman Catholics, it was founded December 8, 1842. It is home to Straub Brewery and the first Benedictine convent in the United States. In 1992, the borough of St. Marys absorbed the surrounding township of Benzinger and incorporated as a city. Despite its place as the second-largest city by area in Pennsylvania behind Philadelphia, its low population leads to it being one of the state's least dense cities.

St. Marys lies in the center of Pennsylvania's elk country. It is one of the few places east of the Mississippi River that allows hunting of wild elk. The area is known for its access to outdoor activities, including trout streams and state hunting lands inside the city limits.

Geography
St. Marys is located at  (41.437600, -78.542724).

Most of that area is unurbanized, and the large size is due to the city's 1992 merger with surrounding Benzinger Township. The city is at a relatively high elevation of 1,666 ft (508 m) above sea level. The city's territory is bordered by Jones Township to the north, Cameron County to the east, Fox and Jay Townships to the south, and Ridgway Township to the west.

The downtown area lies directly on the Eastern Continental Divide, such that water on the eastern side of the city drains into the Atlantic Ocean, while the western side drains to the Gulf of Mexico.

Demographics

As of the census of 2010, there were 13,070 people, 5,579 households, and 3,695 families residing in the city. The population density was 131.6 people per square mile (51.4/km2). There were 6,124 housing units at an average density of 61.7 per square mile (24.1/km2). The racial makeup of the city was 98.5% White, 0.3% African American, 0.05% Native American, 0.4% Asian, 0.05% Pacific Islander, 0.1% from other races, and 0.6% from two or more races. Hispanic or Latino of any race were 0.4% of the population.

There were 5,579 households, out of which 26% had children under the age of 18 living with them, 52.8% were married couples living together, 9.1% had a female householder with no husband present, and 33.8% were non-families. 29.8% of all households were made up of individuals, and 14.2% had someone living alone who was 65 years of age or older. The average household size was 2.29 and the average family size was 2.82.

In the city, the population was spread out, with 20.1% under the age of 18, 59.5% from 18 to 64, and 20.4% who were 65 years of age or older. The median age was 45.6 years.

The median income for a household in the city was $45,802, and the median income for a family was $55,045. Males had a median income of $41,968 versus $29,489 for females. The per capita income for the city was $24,208. About 7% of families and 11.4% of the population were below the poverty line, including 20.3% of those under age 18 and 10.9% of those age 65 or over.

Transportation
St. Marys Municipal Airport lies in the city's southeastern quadrant and serves general aviation.

The city's main highways are PA 255 and PA 120. Bus service is provided by ATA; a daily Fullington Trailways bus line runs through St. Marys as well.

Education

Public school district

Saint Marys Area School District has three elementary schools, one of which, the South St. Marys Street Elementary School, is located within the city.  It houses pre school through fifth grade classes for public school students within the city limits; similar services are provided to residents of Fox Township and Jay Township by, respectively, the Fox Township Elementary School in Kersey and the Bennett's Valley Elementary School in Weedville.

The St. Marys Area Middle School and the St. Marys Area High School are located next to each other on a large complex near the edge of the city.  Grades 6-8 are taught at the middle school, and grades 9-12 are taught at the high school. Saint Marys Area School District was ranked 165th out of 498 Pennsylvania school districts by the Pittsburgh Business Times in 2012.

Catholic school system

St. Marys Catholic Elementary School has one building, which is connected to Queen of the World Church. In 2002, an addition was built, adding four classrooms and a gymnasium. It also recently had a playground added. It houses grades pre-K through 5.

St. Marys Catholic Middle School, is located in the same building as the Elk County Catholic High School. The middle school formerly occupied the old Saint Mary's Parochial school building that was built in the early 1950s. Elk County Catholic High School, formally Elk County Christian High School, houses grades 6-12. It was built in 1961.

Until the early 2000s, the Catholic school system's elementary and middle schools, then known respectively as the Queen of the World School and the St. Marys Parochial School, each served all students up through eighth grade who attended their respective Catholic churches, as did the Sacred Heart School.  When the school system was reworked into its current format due to declining attendance, the Sacred Heart School was closed.

Landmarks
Decker's Chapel has been called the smallest chapel in America.  It is located on South St. Marys Road.

St. Joseph Monastery, home of the Benedictine Sisters of Elk County, was the oldest Benedictine women's religious order in the United States, founded in 1852. In 2013, the Sisters voted unanimously to dissolve the community. The building remains.

Straub Brewery, was founded in St. Marys in 1872  by Peter Straub (1850-1913) of Felldorf, Württemberg, Germany, who purchased the Benzinger Spring Brewery from his father-in-law, Francis Xavier Sorg. Brewing continuously since that time, Straub is the third oldest brewery in the United States and considered an American Legacy Brewery™. It is still owned and operated by the original founding family, now in its seventh generation. Straub is also the smallest pre-Prohibition brewery still in business in the United States.Tours of the brewery include a stop at the "Eternal Tap," at which a person can drink a free glass of Straub beer.

The Bucksgahuda and Western Railroad is a  narrow gauge railroad run by enthusiasts.

Media
The Daily Press is St. Mary's daily newspaper.
WDDH (FM 97.5) is a country music station based in Ridgway and the most powerful station in the region, being heard as far north as Cattaraugus County, New York.
WKBI (AM 1400) operates an Adult Standards/Oldies format. Also heard on 94.5 FM, W233BS.
WKBI (FM 93.9) operates a Contemporary Hit Radio format. WKBI-AM/FM was sold in early 2013 by longtime owner Cary Simpson to Laurel Media, Inc/WDDH 97.5

WKBI-AM/FM and WDDH 97.5 have studios located in Ridgway.

Notable people
 George Albee, psychologist
 Joe Beimel, baseball player
 Gerard J. Campbell, Jesuit and president of Georgetown University
 Dan Conners, professional football athlete; linebacker, Oakland Raiders
 Joan Marie Engel, United States Navy Flag Officer
 Jeff Lloyd, professional football athlete; defensive end, Buffalo Bills and Kansas City Chiefs
 Edward C. Meyer, Chief of Staff, United States Army 1979-83
 Anthony Joseph Schuler, American Roman Catholic bishop
 Nate Sestina (born 1997), basketball player in the Israeli Basketball Premier League
 Joanna Shields, businesswoman and UK Minister for Internet Safety and Security

References

External links

City of St. Marys Official Website
Saint Marys Area Chamber of Commerce
Saint Marys at City-Data.com
Bucksgahuda and Western Railroad - official website

 
Cities in Pennsylvania
Populated places established in 1804
Cities in Elk County, Pennsylvania
1842 establishments in Pennsylvania